The evolution of motorways construction in European Union member states by total number of kilometres existing in that year.
This is a list of the total number of Motorways  by country, member of the European Union. It includes motorways (controlled-access highways), classified as such by the Eurostat.

List of the members of the European Union by the total number of kilometres of motorway built in that year during the 20th century.

 Note: The table above is missing the next European countries due to the lack of kilometres built in the 20th century; Latvia and Malta, .

List of the members of the European Union by the total number of kilometres of motorways built in that year during the 21st century.

 Note: Due to the new European standards in 2011 some European countries had their total number of motorways diminished, examples being Lithuania from 417 km to 309 km, or Estonia 115 km to 0, they became either dual carriageways or national highways.

See also
 List of highest paved roads in Europe by country
List of the highest roads in Scotland
List of highest paved roads in Switzerland
 Highway systems by country
 Principal passes of the Alps
 Transport in Europe
 List of highest railways in Europe
 List of countries by road network size
 History of roads in Ireland#Motorways in the Republic of Ireland

References

See also 
Evolution of motorway construction in European nations

External links

 
 http://www.OECD (2004-02-26). "Glossary of Statistical Terms". Retrieved 2007-07-17.
 http://www.realitatea.md/clasamentul-european-al-autostrazilor-ara-cu-cei-mai-mul-i-kilometri-de-autostrada_9998.html
 http://www.manager.ro/articole/analize/analizele-managerro-autostrazile-romaniei-comparatii-cu-alte-tari-9071.html
 http://old.econtext.ro/dosar--2/analiza/topul-autostrazilor-cati-kilometri-de-autostrada-a-construit-fiecare-stat-din-ue-in-ultimii-20-de-ani-vezi-unde-se-plaseaza-romania.html
 http://www.gandul.info/financiar/romania-o-are-mica-cum-au-ajuns-romanii-sa-aiba-2-4-centimetri-germanii-15-cm-chiar-si-bulgarii-6-cm-de-autostrada-pe-cap-de-locuitor-10805033
 http://www.motorway.cz/motorways
 https://web.archive.org/web/20150224222020/http://www.realitatea.net/cati-kilometri-de-autostrada-a-construit-fiecare-tara-din-ue-in-ultimii-20-de-ani-vezi-topul_877963.html
 http://forum.peundemerg.ro/index.php?topic=251.0
 Richard J. Overy. "Cars, Roads, and Economic Recovery in Germany, 1932–1938". In: War and Economy in the Third Reich. Oxford: Clarendon / New York: Oxford University, 1994. . pp. 68–89
 https://web.archive.org/web/20150225171636/http://www.sntv.kva.se/files/Polhem%202006%E2%80%932007%20Boge.pdf
 http://ec.europa.eu/eurostat/tgm/table.do?tab=table&init=1&language=en&pcode=ttr00002&plugin=1
 http://www.wegen-routes.be/doss/A1n.html
 AVUS

Europe transport-related lists
Europe Highest Paved
Transport and the European Union